Labidochromis mathotho is a species of cichlid endemic to Lake Malawi.  This species grows to a length of  TL.

Etymology
The fish is named in honor of A. J. Mathotho, Chief Fisheries Officer, Malawi

References

Fish of Malawi
mathotho
Fish described in 1976
 Taxa named by Warren E. Burgess
Taxa named by Herbert R. Axelrod
Taxonomy articles created by Polbot
Fish of Lake Malawi